Vivek Thakur is an  Indian politician. He was elected to the Rajya Sabha the upper house of Indian Parliament from Bihar as a member of the  Bharatiya Janata Party.

References

1976 births
Living people
Rajya Sabha members from Bihar
Bharatiya Janata Party politicians from Bihar